The 1999 La Flèche Wallonne was the 63rd edition of La Flèche Wallonne cycle race and was held on 14 April 1999. The race started in Charleroi and finished in Huy. The race was won by Michele Bartoli of the Mapei team.

General classification

References

1999 in road cycling
1999
1999 in Belgian sport
April 1999 sports events in Europe